Mount Pinchot is in the Sierra Nevada in the U.S. state of California. Mount Pinchot is in the Sequoia-Kings Canyon Wilderness of Kings Canyon National Park. The peak lies just northeast of Pinchot Pass and just east of the John Muir Trail.

See also
 Mount Wynne

References

Mountains of Fresno County, California
Mountains of Kings Canyon National Park